Charles François may refer to:

 Charles François (systems scientist) (1922–2019), Belgian administrator, editor and systems scientist
 Charles François (kickboxer) (born 1986), French Muay Thai kickboxer
 Charles François, Marquis de Bonnay (1750–1825), French military, diplomatic, and political figure of the French Revolution

See also